David Henley (1894–1986) was a British actor, singer and film producer. He performed with Gilbert and Sullivan, and became an agent. He moved into casting and film producing.

Select credits
Murder at 3am (1953)
The Legend of the Good Beasts (1956)
The Devil's Pass (1957)
Make Mine a Double (1959)
Stranglehold (1963)
Blaze of Glory (1963)
The Comedy Man (1964)
The Crooked Road (1965)
Circus of Fear (1966)
The Yellow Hat (1966)
The Brides of Fu Manchu (1966)

References

External links
David Henley at IMDb

British film producers